Zaviyeh Khersan (also Romanized as Zāvīyeh Khersān and Zāveyeh Khersān) is a village in Qeblehi Rural District, in the Central District of Dezful County, Khuzestan Province, Iran. At the 2006 census, its population was 227, in 40 families.

References 

Populated places in Dezful County